There are a total of 3 waterfalls on the 2 forks of the Miller River.  Below is a description for all of them:

East Fork

Florence Falls

The falls are made up of several small drops, none over 20 feet high, and can be just a trickle when the river is really low or likely quite large when the river is high.  

The location of this waterfall is often marked on older maps as being just downstream of the mouth of Smith Creek.  The true location is just below the outlet of Lake Dorothy, at a bend in the river.  The falls are located within a narrow gorge.

West Fork

Borderline Falls

 

They occur where the river is squeezed between two large granite slabs and cascades for about 20 feet. It got its name due to the amount of kayakers who run it as well as the river above or below the falls.

Immigration Falls

 

They occur where the river drops over a huge boulder and into another. It got its name due to the amount of kayakers who run it as well as the river above or below the falls.

See also

Miller River
Lake Dorathy

References 

Waterfalls of King County, Washington
Waterfalls of Washington (state)
Mount Baker-Snoqualmie National Forest